Pascal Sébah (1823–1886) was a photographer in Constantinople (now Istanbul) and Cairo, who produced a prolific number of images of  Egypt, Turkey and Greece to serve the tourist trade.

Life and work

Pascal Sébah was born in Constantinople, then the capital of the Ottoman Empire, to an Assyrian father and an Armenian mother.

He initially worked in collaboration with the French photographer, Henri Bechard. After receiving medals at the International Exhibition in Paris, he decided to open his own studio in Constantinople in 1857. Sébah's studio was known as ''El Chark (meaning "The Orient"), situated at 439 Grande Rue de Pera in the center of the city and close by the embassies and hotels where tourists met.

Sébah primarily produced photographs for the tourist trade. By the second half of the 19th century, tourist travel to Egypt had created strong demand for photographs as souvenirs. Sébah was among a group of early photographers in Constantinople and Cairo to capitalise on this demand. These pioneering photographers included Félix Bonfils (1831-1885); Gustave Le Gray (1820-1884), brothers Henri and Emile Bechard; the British-Italian brothers Antonio Beato (c. 1832–1906) and Felice Beato and the Greek Zangaki brothers. By 1873 Sébah was successful enough to open a second studio in Cairo. The same year, he exhibited at the Ottoman pavilion of the Universal Exhibition in Vienna, Austria.

He established a valuable working relationship with Turkish painter Osman Hamdi Bey, taking photographs as part of the artist's preparation, and in which he experimented with light and shade. In turn, Hamdi Bey selected Sébah to illustrate his text on the popular costumes worn by Turkish and other ethnic groups, entitled Les Costumes Populaires de la Turquie en 1873: ouvrage publié sous le patronage de la Commission impériale ottomane pour l'Exposition universelle de Vienne and published in 1873.

Following his death on 25 June 1886, the studio continued in business. It was managed by his brother, Cosmi, and in 1888 Pollicarpe Joiallier became a partner. At this time, the company was renamed Sebah & Joaillier Pascal's son, Jean Pascal Sébah, also joined in 1888 and went on to run the studio with other photographers. The firm developed a reputation as the leading representative of Orientalist photography and in 1889 was appointed the Photographers by Appointment to the Prussian Court. Sébah's studio continued operations, in one form or another, until 1952 at the same address and then moved until its closure in 1973.

Sebah, a Syrian Catholic, was buried in the Latin cemetery in Ferikoy. His son, Jean Pascal Sébah, is also buried there.

Gallery of photographs by Sébah

See also
 List of Orientalist artists
 Orientalism

References

General references
 Fabrizio Casaretto, Sébah & Joaillier photos. www.sebahjoaillier.com 
 Engin Özendes, From Sébah & Joaillier to Foto Sabah. Orientalism in Photography, Istanbul, YKY, 1999.
 Michelle L. Woodward, "Between Orientalist Clichés and Images of Modernization: Photographic Practice in the Late Ottoman Era," History of Photography, winter 2003, Vol. 27, No. 4.

External links

 Les Costumes Popularies de la Turquie en 1873 by Osman Bey Hamdi with illustrations by Pascal Sébah
 Vintage Rag Trader - Vintage Photographs by Pascal Sebah
 Pascal Sebah blog on Sebah's biography
 Pascal Sébah blog on Sebah's biography
   Bibliothèque numérique de l'INHA - Fonds photographique Pascal Sébah de l'ENSBA

1823 births
1886 deaths
19th-century photographers
Armenian photographers
Orientalist painters
Early photographers in Egypt